Pierre André Labric (born 30 June 1921) is a French organist, pedagogue and composer.

Biography 
Born in Conches-en-Ouche in Eure, Normandy, Labric studied the organ at Rouen Conservatory under Marcel Lanquetuit, and at the Paris Conservatoire with organ under Marcel Dupré and harmony under Maurice Duruflé (he received the first prize in this subject in 1948 along with Pierre Cochereau). Later, he studied organ privately with Jeanne Demessieux, whose complete organ works he recorded on LP. During Jeanne Demessieux's tenure as titular organist at La Madeleine in Paris, he was her assistant and substitute. He also substituted for Pierre Cochereau at Notre Dame Cathedral in Paris.
Pierre Labric recorded the complete organ symphonies of Louis Vierne (6) and Charles-Marie Widor (10). Both of these were world premiere recordings. In addition, he recorded the Preludes and Fugues of Camille Saint-Saëns and the complete Promenades en Provence of Eugène Reuchsel.

The majority of his recordings were made at Saint-Ouen in Rouen with its famous organ from 1890 by Aristide Cavaillé-Coll (although Labric was never titular organist at this church - he was titular organist of the church of Saint-Gervais with its smaller organ in the same city for some time). In addition, Labric also served as a substitute organist at Notre-Dame-de-Paris when its titulaire, Cochereau, was unavailable.

His students have included Michael Matthes and Maxime Patel.

Compositions
 Hommage à Jeanne Demessieux for organ (Paris: Durand, 1970)
 I. Allegro
 II. Largo
 III. Fugue
 Communion, op. 8 for organ 
 Deux Louanges à Notre-Dame des Roses: Arrivederci, Salve Mater for organ

Discography
 Jeanne Demessieux: L'oeuvre pour orgue.
 Te Deum op. 11, Répons pour le temps de Pâques, 12 Choral-Préludes op. 8, Triptyque op. 7, Prélude et Fugue en Ut op. 13, Sept Méditations sur le Saint-Esprit op. 6, Six Etudes op. 5. Pierre Labric: Hommage à Jeanne Demessieux.
 Pierre Labric, Organist. Recorded in July 1971 (Te Deum), December 1971 (Choral-Preludes, Répons), October 1972 (Méditations, Études), November 1972 (Triptyque, Prélude et Fugue) and April 1974 (Hommage) at St. Ouen, Rouen, and St. Pierre, Angoulème (Six Études, Sept Méditations). Sigean: Solstice, 2017. 2 CD's.
 Felix Mendelssohn: Les Six Sonates.
 Pierre Labric, Organ (Saint-Ouen, Rouen). Sigean: Solstice, 2015. SOCD 303. 1 CD.
 Camille Saint-Saëns: Six Préludes et Fugues.
 Préludes and Fugues op. 99 and 109. Eugène Gigout: Grand choeur dialogué (1881).
 Pierre Labric, Organ. Recorded in 1973/74 at Saint-Ouen, Rouen. Sigean: Solstice, 2015. SOCD 305. 1 CD.
 Eugène Reuchsel: Promenades en Provence.
 Nuages ensoleillés sur le cap Nègre, Le moulin d'Alphonse Daudet, La chartreuse de Montrieux au crépuscule, Jour de fête aux Saintes Marie-de-la-Mer, Profil de la porte d'Orange à Carpentras, Tambourinaires sur la place des Vieux Salins, Grandes orgues à Saint-Maximin, Visions à l'Abbaye de Sénanque.
 Pierre Labric, Organist. Recorded between 1970 and 1974 at Saint-Ouen, Rouen. Sigean: Solstice, 2013. SOCD 289. 1 CD.
 Louis Vierne: Pièces en style libre, Les deux Messes, Triptyque.
 Pierre Labric, Organ. Recorded at Saint-Ouen, Rouen. Sigean: Solstice, 2012. SOCD 286/8. 3 CD's.
 Louis Vierne: Les Six Symphonies pour orgue.
 Pierre Labric, Organ. Recorded in November 1969 and November 1970 at Saint-Sernin, Toulouse. Sigean: Solstice, 2011. SOCD 277/9. 3 CD's.
 Louis Vierne: Les Pièces de Fantaisie.
 Pierre Labric, Organ. Recorded at Saint-Ouen, Rouen. Sigean: Solstice, 2013. SOCD 290/1. 2 CD's.
 Œuvres de Louis Vierne et Charles-Marie Widor.
 Pierre Labric, Organ (Notre-Dame de Paris). Sigean: Solstice, 2013. SOCD 296. 1 CD.
 Jeanne Demessieux: Pièces pour orgue.
 Six Etudes op. 5, Méditations sur le Saint-Esprit op. 6 (Nos. 2 & 7), Triptyque op. 7, Attende Domine (Choral-Preludes op. 8), Te Deum op. 11. Pierre Labric: Hommage à Jeanne Demessieux (first movement).
 Pierre Labric, Organist. Recorded in 1969 and 1972 at Notre-Dame de Paris. Sigean: Solstice, 2010. 1 CD.
 Franz Liszt:  Pièces pour orgue.
 Prélude et fugue sur BACH; Fantaisie et fugue sur le choral "Ad nos"; Funérailles (transcribed by Jeanne Demessieux); Variations sur "Weinen, Klagen".
 Pierre Labric, Organist. Recorded November 24–25, 1973 and April 28–30, 1974 at Saint-Ouen, Rouen. Sigean: Solstice, 2010. SOCD 264. 1 CD.
 Eugène Reuchsel: Promenades en Provence.
 Nuages ensoleillés sur le cap Nègre, Le moulin d'Alphonse Daudet, La chartreuse de Montrieux au crépuscule, Jour de fête aux Saintes Marie-de-la-Mer, Profil de la porte d'Orange à Carpentras, Tambourinaires sur la place des Vieux Salins, Grandes orgues à Saint-Maximin, Visions à l'Abbaye de Sénanque.
 Pierre Labric, Organist. Recorded at St. Ouen, Rouen. Rouen, France: Grand Orgue, c. 1975.
 Jeanne Demessieux: Complete Organ Works.
 Jeanne Demessieux: Te Deum op. 11, Répons pour le temps de Pâques, 12 Choral-Préludes op. 8, Triptyque op. 7, Prélude et Fugue en Ut op. 13, Sept Méditations sur le Saint Esprit op. 6, Six Etudes op. 5. Pierre Labric: Hommage à Jeanne Demessieux.
 Pierre Labric, Organist. Recorded in July and December 1971 and October 1972 at Saint-Ouen, Rouen, and Saint-Pierre, Angoulème (Six Études, Sept Méditations). Musical Heritage Society, 1974.
 Camille Saint-Saëns: Six Préludes and Fugues.
 Book 1, op. 99: No. 1, E major. No. 2, B major. No. 3, E flat major. Book 2, op. 109: No. 1, D minor. No. 2, G major. No. 3, C major.
 Pierre Labric, Organist. Recorded in July 1973 at St. Ouen, Rouen. Musical Heritage Society. 1 LP.
 Louis Vierne: Organ Symphonies Nos. 1 & 2.
 Pierre Labric, Organist. Recorded in November 1969 and November 1970 at Saint-Sernin, Toulouse.
 Louis Vierne: Organ Symphonies Nos. 3 & 4.
 Pierre Labric, Organist. Recorded in November 1969 and November 1970 at Saint-Sernin, Toulouse.
 Louis Vierne: Organ Symphonies Nos. 5 & 6.
 Pierre Labric, Organist. Recorded in November 1969 and November 1970 at Saint-Sernin, Toulouse.
 Louis Vierne:  20 Pièces en style libre op. 31.
 Pierre Labric, Organist. Recorded at St. Ouen, Rouen. Musical Heritage Society.
 Louis Vierne:  Pièces de Fantaisie (complete).
 Pierre Labric, Organist. Recorded at St. Ouen, Rouen. Rouen, France: Grand Orgue. LVM 771 101, LVM 780 120, LVM 791 003. 3 LPs.
 Charles-Marie Widor: Organ Symphonies Nos. 1 & 2.
 Pierre Labric, Organist. Recorded Recorded in July, October and December 1971 at Saint-Ouen, Rouen.
 Charles-Marie Widor: Organ Symphonies Nos. 3 & 4.
 Pierre Labric, Organist. Recorded Recorded in July, October and December 1971 at Saint-Ouen, Rouen.
 Charles-Marie Widor: Organ Symphonies Nos. 5 & 6.
 Pierre Labric, Organist. Recorded Recorded in July, October and December 1971 at Saint-Ouen, Rouen.
 Charles-Marie Widor: Organ Symphonies Nos. 7 & 8.
 Pierre Labric, Organist. Recorded Recorded in July, October and December 1971 at Saint-Ouen, Rouen.
 Charles-Marie Widor: Organ Symphonies Nos. 9 & 10.
 Pierre Labric, Organist. Recorded Recorded in July, October and December 1971 at Saint-Ouen, Rouen.
 Pierre Labric: Concert d'Orgue No. 1.
 Henry Purcell: Trumpet Tune; Johann Sebastian Bach: Magnificat BWV 733, Fantasia et Fuga in G minor BWV 542; César  Franck: Pastorale; Louis Vierne: Carillon de Westminster.
 Pierre Labric, Organist. Recorded at St. Ouen, Rouen. Rouen, France: Grand Orgue. LCM 760110. 1 LP.
 Pierre Labric: Concert d'Orgue No. 2.
 Eugène Gigout: Grand Chœur dialogue; Felix Mendelssohn Bartholdy: Sonata II; Louis Vierne: Trois Improvisations reconstituées par Maurice Duruflé; Albert Roussel: Prélude et fughetta; Franz Liszt: Prélude et fugue sur le nom de BACH, Adagio in D-flat major.
 Pierre Labric, Organist. Recorded November 1973, April and October 1973 at St. Ouen, Rouen. Rouen, France: Grand Orgue. RLM 770511. 1 LP.
 Pierre Labric: Unpublished Recordings.
 César Franck: Final; Johann Sebastian Bach: Preludes and Fugues; Louis Vierne: Triptyque, 4 Pièces en style libre; Felix Mendelssohn Bartholdy: Three Preludes and Fugues, Five Sonatas; Jean-Claude Touche: Complete Organ Works (Pastorale, Scherzetto, Fugue, Elévation, Thème et variations sur Veni Creator); Jacques Ibert: Trois Pièces; Eugène Reuchsel: Autres Pièces des Promenades en Provence.
 Pierre Labric, Organist. Recorded during the 1970s, but never commercially released.

References

Bibliography
 Eschbach, Jesse. "An Interview with Pierre Labric." The Diapason''' 111, no. 2 (February 2020): 14-16.
 Labric, Pierre. "Jeanne Demessieux (1921-1968): Pariser Orgellegende von La Madeleine." Organ: Journal für die Orgel 2, no. 2 (1999): 36-38.
 Labric, Pierre. "Jeanne Demessieux: Présentation des œuvres pour orgue." In: Association Maurice et Marie-Madeleine Duruflé (ed.) (2009): Hommage à Jeanne Demessieux. Bulletin no. 9 (2009), 70-75.
 Labric, Pierre. "Jeanne Demessieux: Analyse de l'œuvre pour orgue." In: Association Maurice et Marie-Madeleine Duruflé (ed.) (2009): Hommage à Jeanne Demessieux. Bulletin no. 9 (2009), 76-96.
 Tréfouel, Dominique. Interview with Pierre Labric on August 20, 2005. In: Dominique Tréfouel, Jeanne Demessieux''. Lyon, France: J2C/ALDRUI Éditions, 2005, 97-107.

1921 births
Living people
Composers for pipe organ
20th-century classical composers
French classical organists
French male organists
French classical composers
French male classical composers
People from Eure
Organ improvisers
20th-century French composers
21st-century organists
20th-century French male musicians
21st-century French male musicians
French centenarians
Men centenarians
Male classical organists